The Story of a Real Man is an opera in four acts by the Russian composer Sergei Prokofiev, his opus 117. It was written from 1947 to 1948, and was his last opera. 

The libretto, by the composer and his wife Mira Mendelson, is based on the eponymous novel by Boris Polevoy; this in turn was based on the story of pilot Aleksey Maresyev. The opera received its premiere on 3 December 1948 at the Kirov Theatre, Leningrad. The audience was made up of Soviet cultural officials who gave the work a poor reception. This was a great disappointment to the composer who had intended the opera to rehabilitate his reputation with the Communist authorities after he had been accused of "formalism" earlier in the year. As a result, performances of The Story of a Real Man were forbidden to the general public until after Prokofiev's death. It received its public premiere on 7 October 1960 at the Bolshoi Theatre, Moscow.

Roles

Synopsis
The story is set during the Second World War. Aleksey, a Soviet fighter pilot, is shot down in combat against the Germans and badly wounded. He is rescued and cared for by villagers from a collective farm before being transferred to a hospital, where both his legs are amputated. He is inspired by the thought of his girlfriend and the support of his fellow patients, one of whom tells him the story of a First World War ace who continued to fly after losing one of his legs. The opera ends with Aleksey taking to the air again in his new plane.

Recordings
 Yevgeny Kibkalo (as Aleksey), Glafira Deomidova (as Olga). Chorus and orchestra of the Bolshoi Theatre, dir. Mark Ermler. Studio recording, 1961, Moscow, based on 1960 Bolshoi Theatre production; CHANDOS CHAN 10002 (2CD, with libretto in Cyrillic, and translations). The recording is abridged.

References

Further reading
Holden, Amanda (Ed.), The New Penguin Opera Guide, New York: Penguin Putnam, 2001. 

Operas by Sergei Prokofiev
Russian-language operas
Operas
1948 operas
Aviation plays and operas
Operas based on novels
Operas set in the 20th century
Operas based on real people
Cultural depictions of Russian men
Cultural depictions of aviators
Cultural depictions of soldiers
Operas set in Russia